William Goodenough (1867–1945) was a Royal Navy officer.

William Goodenough may also refer to:

 Bill Goodenough (1863–1905), baseball player
 Sir William Goodenough, 1st Baronet (1899–1951), banker, of the Goodenough baronets
 Sir William McLernon Goodenough, 3rd Baronet (born 1954), of the Goodenough baronets
William Howley Goodenough (1833–1898), British Army officer
 William Goodenough (priest) (1772–1854), Archdeacon of Carlisle

See also
Goodenough (disambiguation)